The 2018–19 Tanzanian Premier League is the 54th season of the Tanzanian Premier League, the top-tier football league in Tanzania (mainland only), since its establishment in 1965. The season started on 22 August 2018.

League table

References

Tanzanian Premier League
Tanzanian Premier League
Tanzanian Premier League
Tanzania